is a Japanese professional racing cyclist. He rode at the 2015 UCI Track Cycling World Championships. In Japan he is mostly known as a professional keirin cyclist.

References

External links
 

1990 births
Living people
Japanese male cyclists
Place of birth missing (living people)
Keirin cyclists
Asian Games medalists in cycling
Cyclists at the 2018 Asian Games
Asian Games bronze medalists for Japan
Medalists at the 2018 Asian Games
21st-century Japanese people